Blind tetra is a common name for several cave dwelling fishes and may refer to:

Astyanax mexicanus, native to Texas and Mexico
Stygichthys typhlops, native to Brazil

Fish common names